Colin Willis  is a New Zealand sport shooter who competed at five Paralympic games – 1984, 1992, 1996, 2000 and 2004. He was also a silver medallist at the 2002 IPC Shooting World Championships.

In the 2006 New Year Honours, Willis was appointed a Member of the New Zealand Order of Merit, for services to sport.

References

External links 
 

Living people
Year of birth missing (living people)
New Zealand male sport shooters
Paralympic shooters of New Zealand
Shooters at the 1984 Summer Paralympics
Shooters at the 1992 Summer Paralympics
Shooters at the 1996 Summer Paralympics
Shooters at the 2000 Summer Paralympics
Shooters at the 2004 Summer Paralympics
Members of the New Zealand Order of Merit